Gaillard Thomas Lapsley (1871–1949) was an American constitutional historian and fellow of Trinity College, Cambridge, 1904–1949.

A brass plaque dedicated to Lapsley's memory can be found in Trinity College Chapel.

He graduated from Harvard University in 1893.

Selected publications
The county palatine of Durham: A study in constitutional history. Longmans Green, New York, 1900.
The America of today, being lectures delivered at the local lectures summer meeting of the University of Cambridge, 1918. University Press, Cambridge, 1919.
"The Parliamentary title of Henry IV", English Historical Review, XLIX (1934).
Some recent advance in English constitutional history: (before 1485). University Press, Cambridge, 1936.
Crown, community, and Parliament in the later Middle Ages; studies in English constitutional history.  	Blackwell, Oxford, 1951. (Oxford Studies in Mediaeval History, Vol. 6.)

References 

1871 births
1949 deaths
Fellows of Trinity College, Cambridge
American Episcopalians
American historians
Harvard University alumni